Jordi Ribera Romans (born 3 May 1963) is a Spanish handball coach of the Spain national team.

References

1963 births
Living people
Spanish expatriate sportspeople in Argentina
Spanish expatriate sportspeople in Brazil
Spanish people of Brazilian descent
Spanish handball coaches
People from Gironès
Sportspeople from the Province of Girona
Handball coaches of international teams